James Patrick 'Chick' Doyle was a former Irish badminton player and coach. He was coached by Frank Peard and won eleven Irish National Badminton Championships titles in men's singles and doubles in the period 1954–1964.

Early and personal life
Chick Doyle was born to Edward James ("Jimmy") Doyle, an employee of the Dublin Gas Company, and Josephine Doyle (née McNamara) in April 1930. He was the eldest of three siblings.  His sister Ursula Doyle (born 1931), was a child performer, later actress, stage director and second wife of Jimmy O'Dea, and his brother Noel Doyle (born 1932), was also a child performer and entertainer before emigrating to Canada. In 1958 Doyle married Marie Clarke.  They had four children.  His daughter Elaine Doyle won a Ladies doubles Irish National Badminton Championships title in 1986.

Playing career
Doyle began playing in the Dublin Gas Company club where his talent was recognised by Geoff Trapnell and by 1948 was playing league badminton with the club. In that same year he first appeared playing at national tournaments. The Irish Times reports of the Irish Close Badminton tournament of December 1948 lists Doyle as losing in the first round of the senior men's singles to Frank Peard and competing unsuccessfully in a number of junior events. As well as being a player, Peard was instrumental in implementing intensive coaching schemes which Doyle benefitted from. Doyle's playing career progressed rapidly and by December 1949 he was playing for the Midland (now Leinster) branch interprovincial team at the age of nineteen. 

Doyle was first called up to the Ireland national badminton team for their match against Scotland in 1951. He played thirty times for Ireland. 1951 also saw Doyle first reach the final of the men's singles in the Irish National Badminton Championships, with Frank Peard beating his protégé in three sets.  In 1952 he emigrated to Australia.  Doyle continued his playing career in Australia in 1952 and 1953, playing for the Victoria state badminton team and competing in the Australian National Badminton Championships, where he was a runner up in the men's doubles in 1952. He placed seventh in the 1952 Australian men's singles rankings. He subsequently returned to Ireland.  1955 saw Doyle emerge as winner of the men's singles in the Scottish Open tournament and in 1956, he went on to win the men's singles in the Irish Open tournament.  Doyle maintained his dominance in Irish men's badminton until 1961, when for the first time in a decade he lost to another Irish player, Lennox Robinson, at an interprovincial tournament.

Over the course of his playing career, Doyle achieved an unprecedented eight consecutive title wins in men's singles at the Irish National Badminton Championships, a feat equaled only by Irish Olympian professional badminton player Scott Evans in 2012. Doyle and Evans are second only to Michael Watt in total Irish men's singles title wins, with Watt achieving a record nine non-consecutive men's singles Irish titles as a player.

Later life
Following his retirement from playing, Doyle took up coaching and administration. By 1968 he was serving on Midland branch executive committee and was president of the Leinster branch of the Badminton Union of Ireland from 1973 to 1978.  He died of heart related health problems in 1985.

Irish National Badminton Championships wins

Appearances at the All England Badminton Championships

References

Irish male badminton players
1930 births
1985 deaths